Göran Johansson (15 March 1957 – 30 October 2021) was a Swedish rower. He competed in the men's coxless four event at the 1980 Summer Olympics. Johansson died on 30 October 2021, at the age of 64.

References

External links
 

1957 births
2021 deaths
Olympic rowers of Sweden
Rowers at the 1980 Summer Olympics
Sportspeople from Gothenburg
Swedish male rowers